Hand of Death, also known as Countdown in Kung Fu, is a 1976 Hong Kong martial arts film written and directed by John Woo. It stars Doran Tan and James Tien in leading roles, and features early supporting performances from Jackie Chan and Sammo Hung. Yuen Biao also makes a cameo appearance. In addition to their acting roles, Hung also worked as stunt co-ordinator, whilst Biao also performed much of the stuntwork, including doubling for both of the principal stars.

Plot
During the Qing Dynasty the Shaolin disciples are hunted down by a powerful warrior, Shih Shao-Feng, who wants to rid China of the Shaolin. At a remote training camp a group of Shaolin train together. Their best student Yun Fei is given the task of taking down Shih and his reign of terror. Along the way he befriends Chan Yuan-lung's character, Tan Feng, who is a blacksmith.

Yun Fei arrives at Shih's camp and tries to take him, but fails. His Shaolin techniques are useless against Shih's "extended iron claw". When Shih beats him, he leaves the rest to his eight bodyguards, who each have weapons such as swords, shields and spears.

Yun Fei escapes with the help of the blacksmith, goes to a village and discovers Shih's men are taking apart the village and pillaging anything they can to scare the villagers into submission.

Tan befriends two people along the way, including a brilliant swordsman who has never drawn his sword after he accidentally killed a prostitute he loved.

The team forms a coalition to defeat Shih Shao-Feng.

With battle plans laid and the heroes trained, they prepare themselves for the battle ahead of them. After their training, Yun Fei's friends cut off his pigtail. Yun Fei and all the heroes will create a diversion, where they will assail Shih's headquarters in separate groups.

The diversion and ambush on the following day is ultimately successful. Luring away Shih's lieutenant Tu Ching (Sammo Hung)  Tan Feng is the first to act in the climactic battle. Arriving at the gate of the pagoda which is the stronghold of Shih Shao-Feng, he proceeds to kill off several guards, including two of Shih's elite fighters. The rest of the characters reach a grassland where four more elite fighters under Shih's command come by, leading to a prolonged fight between the heroes and four more of Shih's warriors.

Unfortunately for Yun Fei's gang, the battle goes on longer than anticipated, and Shih realises their plans. Tan Feng returns to rendezvous with his friends and assist them in battle, but is mortally wounded whilst killing another elite. Yun Fei and the other heroes manage to kill the rest of the elite fighters and they escape, with Shih, Du and a small troop of their men in pursuit.

More and more of the heroes are killed as the film reaches its end, while on a nearby beach Yunfei beats Tu to death and kills off Shih's last elite fighter.

In the end, Yunfei faces off against Shih and his remaining soldiers, defeating them all single-handedly, then he fights Shih and wins.

The movie ends with Yunfei riding past the graves of all his friends, paying his respects.

Cast

Production
According to his book I Am Jackie Chan: My Life in Action, Chan was completely knocked unconscious when he did the stunts on this film. Woo recalled that the stunt, which involved Chan getting launched back by wires after getting kicked mid-air, caused Chan to land on his head and become unconscious for around 20 minutes.

References

External links 
 
 
 

1976 films
1976 martial arts films
1970s martial arts films
Films directed by John Woo
Hong Kong martial arts films
1970s Mandarin-language films
1970s Hong Kong films